Royal Consort Sug-ui of the Geumseong Beom clan (Hangul: 숙의 금성 범씨, Hanja: 淑儀 錦城 范氏; 1838 – 23 January 1884) was a concubine of King Cheoljong of Joseon.

Biography
The future Lady Sug-ui was born in 1838, as the daughter of Beom Won-sik (범원식), into the Geumseong Beom clan.

She became a concubine after receiving seungeun (승은), and in 1858, she gave birth to Princess Yeongsuk (영숙옹주), later known as Princess Yeonghye (영혜옹주). After Cheoljong's death, on January 16, 1864, she lived outside the palace with her daughter.

Royal Consort Beom Sug-ui died on January 23, 1884 (20th year of King Gojong's reign), at the age of 46. She was originally buried in Hongeun-dong, Seodaemun District, Seoul, but in 1969, she was moved to the Seosamneung Cluster, in Goyang, Gyeonggi Province, the same location as the tombs of King Cheoljong and his wife, Queen Cheorin. On May 26, 1970, her tomb become the Korean Historic Site No. 200.

Her daughter was the only one of Cheoljong's descendants to survive. His other children died during infancy. However, her daughter also died in 1872, at the age of 14 (9th year of King Gojong's reign), without any issue.

In popular culture
Portrayed by Yoon Cho-hee in the 1975 TBC TV Series King's First Love.
Portrayed by Chae Si-ra in the 1990 MBC TV series Daewongun.

References

1838 births
1884 deaths
Royal consorts of the Joseon dynasty
Geumseong Beom clan